Tillandsia subg. Allardtia is a subgenus of the genus Tillandsia.

Species

 Tillandsia abbreviata H. Luther
 Tillandsia acuminata L.B. Smith
 Tillandsia adpressiflora Mez
 Tillandsia aequatorialis L.B. Smith
 Tillandsia alvareziae Rauh
 Tillandsia antillana L.B. Smith
 Tillandsia archeri L.B. Smith
 Tillandsia arenicola L.B. Smith
 Tillandsia atroviridipetala Matuda
 Tillandsia australis Mez
 Tillandsia bakiorum H. Luther
 Tillandsia balsasensis Rauh
 Tillandsia barbeyana Wittmack
 Tillandsia barthlottii Rauh
 Tillandsia biflora Ruiz & Pavón
 Tillandsia boliviana Mez
 Tillandsia boliviensis Baker
 Tillandsia bongarana L.B. Smith
 Tillandsia brenneri Rauh
 Tillandsia brevilingua Mez ex Harms
 Tillandsia breviturneri Betancur & N. García
 Tillandsia buchlohii Rauh
 Tillandsia buseri Mez
 Tillandsia cajamarcensis Rauh
 Tillandsia calochlamys Ehlers & L. Hromadnik
 Tillandsia caloura Harms
 Tillandsia cardenasii L.B. Smith
 Tillandsia carrierei André
 Tillandsia cauliflora Mez & Wercklé ex Mez
 Tillandsia cauligera Mez
 Tillandsia cernua L.B. Smith
 Tillandsia cerrateana L.B. Smith
 Tillandsia chaetophylla Mez
 Tillandsia chiletensis Rauh
 Tillandsia churinensis Rauh
 Tillandsia chusgonensis L. Hromadnik
 Tillandsia clavigera Mez
 Tillandsia cochabambae E. Gross & Rauh
 Tillandsia coinaensis Ehlers
 Tillandsia compacta Grisebach
 Tillandsia complanata Bentham
 Tillandsia confertiflora André
 Tillandsia confinis L.B. Smith
 Tillandsia cuatrecasasii L.B. Smith
 Tillandsia cucullata L.B. Smith
 Tillandsia demissa L.B. Smith
 Tillandsia denudata André
 Tillandsia dexteri H. Luther
 Tillandsia dichrophylla L.B. Smith
 Tillandsia disticha Kunth
 Tillandsia dorotheehaseae Hase
 Tillandsia dudleyi L.B. Smith
 Tillandsia dura Baker
 Tillandsia edithae Rauh
 Tillandsia elongata Kunth
 Tillandsia elvira-grossiae Rauh
 Tillandsia emergens Mez & Sodiro ex Mez
 Tillandsia engleriana Wittmack
 Tillandsia ermitae L. Hromadnik
 Tillandsia excavata L.B. Smith
 Tillandsia excelsa Grisebach
 Tillandsia fassettii L.B. Smith
 Tillandsia fendleri Grisebach
 Tillandsia floribunda Kunth
 Tillandsia francisci W. Till & J.R. Grant
 Tillandsia fusiformis L.B. Smith
 Tillandsia gerdae Ehlers
 Tillandsia gerd-muelleri W. Weber
 Tillandsia glauca L.B. Smith
 Tillandsia glossophylla L.B. Smith
 Tillandsia guatemalensis L.B. Smith
 Tillandsia gymnobotrya Baker
 Tillandsia hegeri Ehlers
 Tillandsia helmutii L. Hromadnik
 Tillandsia heterophylla E. Morren
 Tillandsia hirtzii Rauh
 Tillandsia hoeijeri H. Luther
 Tillandsia hotteana Urban
 Tillandsia huarazensis Ehlers & W. Till
 Tillandsia humboldtii Baker
 Tillandsia ignesiae Mez
 Tillandsia imporaensis Ehlers
 Tillandsia incarnata Kunth
 Tillandsia indigofera Mez & Sodiro
 Tillandsia interrupta Mez
 Tillandsia ionochroma André ex Mez
 Tillandsia kauffmannii Ehlers
 Tillandsia kessleri H. Luther
 Tillandsia koideae Rauh & E. Gross
 Tillandsia krahnii Rauh
 Tillandsia krukoffiana L.B. Smith
 Tillandsia kuntzeana Mez
 Tillandsia lajensis André
 Tillandsia laminata L.B. Smith
 Tillandsia latifolia Meyen
 Tillandsia leiboldiana Schlechtendal
 Tillandsia lithophila L. Hromadnik
 Tillandsia longifolia Baker
 Tillandsia lopezii L.B. Smith
 Tillandsia lotteae H. Hromadnik
 Tillandsia loxichaensis Ehlers
 Tillandsia lucida E. Morren ex Baker
 Tillandsia macrodactylon Mez
 Tillandsia maculata Ruiz & Pavón
 Tillandsia makrinii L. Hromadnik
 Tillandsia malyi L. Hromadnik
 Tillandsia marnieri-lapostollei Rauh
 Tillandsia mauryana L.B. Smith
 Tillandsia micans L.B. Smith
 Tillandsia myriantha Baker
 Tillandsia nervisepala (Gilmartin) L.B. Smith
 Tillandsia nolleriana Ehlers
 Tillandsia oblivata L. Hromadnik
 Tillandsia oerstediana L.B. Smith
 Tillandsia orbicularis L.B. Smith
 Tillandsia orogenes Standley & L.O. Williams
 Tillandsia oroyensis Mez
 Tillandsia oxapampae Rauh & von Bismarck
 Tillandsia pachyaxon L.B. Smith
 Tillandsia pallescens Betancur & N. García
 Tillandsia pastensis André
 Tillandsia penascoensis Ehlers & Lautner
 Tillandsia pentasticha Rauh & Wülfinghoff
 Tillandsia pinnatodigitata Mez
 Tillandsia plumosa Baker
 Tillandsia polyantha Mez & Sodiro
 Tillandsia pomacochae Rauh
 Tillandsia pseudocardenasii W. Weber
 Tillandsia pseudomicans Rauh
 Tillandsia purpurascens Rauh
 Tillandsia pyramidata André
 Tillandsia queroensis Gilmartin
 Tillandsia raackii H. Luther
 Tillandsia racinae L.B. Smith
 Tillandsia rariflora André
 Tillandsia rauschii Rauh & Lehmann
 Tillandsia reducta L.B. Smith
 Tillandsia remota Wittmack
 Tillandsia restrepoana André
 Tillandsia reuteri Rauh
 Tillandsia reversa L.B. Smith
 Tillandsia rhodosticta L.B. Smith
 Tillandsia roezlii E. Morren
 Tillandsia romeroi L.B. Smith
 Tillandsia rubella Baker
 Tillandsia rubia Ehlers & L. Colgan
 Tillandsia rubroviolacea Rauh
 Tillandsia rudolfii E. Gross & Hase
 Tillandsia rupicola Baker
 Tillandsia rusbyi Baker
 Tillandsia sagasteguii L.B. Smith
 Tillandsia samaipatensis W. Till
 Tillandsia sangii Ehlers
 Tillandsia santieusebii Morillo & Oliva-Esteva
 Tillandsia sceptriformis Mez & Sodiro ex Mez
 Tillandsia schimperiana Wittmack
 Tillandsia schultzei Harms
 Tillandsia secunda Kunth
 Tillandsia selleana Harms
 Tillandsia sessemocinoi Lopez-Ferrari, Espejo & P. Blanco
 Tillandsia sigmoidea L.B. Smith
 Tillandsia sodiroi Mez
 Tillandsia somnians L.B. Smith
 Tillandsia sphaerocephala Baker
 Tillandsia standleyi L.B. Smith
 Tillandsia stellifera L. Hromadnik
 Tillandsia stenoura Harms
 Tillandsia stipitata L.B. Smith
 Tillandsia subconcolor L.B. Smith
 Tillandsia suescana L.B. Smith
 Tillandsia superba Mez & Sodiro
 Tillandsia tectorum E. Morren
 Tillandsia tomekii L. Hromadnik
 Tillandsia tortilis Klotzsch ex Baker
 Tillandsia tovarensis Mez
 Tillandsia tragophoba Dillon
 Tillandsia truxillana L.B. Smith
 Tillandsia turneri Baker
 Tillandsia ultima L.B. Smith
 Tillandsia violascens Mez
 Tillandsia walteri Mez
 Tillandsia werdermannii Harms
 Tillandsia wurdackii L.B. Smith
 Tillandsia zaratensis W. Weber
 Tillandsia zarumensis Gilmartin
 Tillandsia zecheri W. Till

References
 Bromeliad Species Picture Index Genera P-Z, version 8/2009

Plant subgenera
Allardtia
Historically recognized angiosperm taxa